A fandom is a subculture of people sharing a common interest.

Fandom may also refer to:

 Fandom (website), a wiki hosting service
 Fandom (album), by Waterparks